The Belize Coast Guard (until 2016, the Belize National Coast Guard Service) is the maritime security, search and rescue, and the maritime and law enforcement service branch of Belize.

The new service began operations with seven impounded Eduardoño fast craft and 50 men drawn from the disbanded BDF Maritime Wing. The Coast Guard was originally established as a part of Belize Defence Force established in November 2005 with the assistance of the United States Coast Guard. It became an independent branch of the Belizean  Armed Forces in November 2005. Commandant of the Belize Coast Guard is Captain Elton Bennett.

Missions
Coast Guard men and women are deployed around the clock patrolling the internal waters and territorial seas. On the northern frontier, their joint operating base at Consejo protects the local economy from the negative impacts of illegal contraband and acts as the northern cut off for drug trafficking. On their southern boundary they stand guard at the Sarstoon river ensuring sovereignty and territorial integrity of Belize. They stand ready for anything (Utrinque Paratus).

The Belize Coast Guard mission includes:
 Maritime safety
 Maritime security
 Marine Conservation
Maintaining sovereignty of Belize sea space
Naval defence of Belize

Like other naval forces in the region, the BCG mostly confronts crime at sea. “What occupies most of their time is really the transnational organised crime in the form of drug trafficking and weapon smuggling. The BCG also works to prevent illegal fishing and other illicit activity affecting the Belizean maritime ecosystem, supporting the Belize.

The Coast Guard Service coordinates its activities with the Belize Defence Force and the Belize Police Department.

Belize Coast Guard SEALs
A selection and training course run by US Navy SEAL personnel saw eight BCG personnel graduate as Belizean SEALs, becoming the founding members of the unit. By 2014 CSOG was deploying in the field, gathering intelligence and carrying out offensive operations that led to a gradual drop in crime in northern Ambergris Caye. Since then more personnel have been trained and the unit has grown. Armed with M4A1 rifles, FN M249 Squad Automatic Weapons, M240 machine guns, and Remington Model 700 sniper rifles, CSOG operatives are as proficient in maritime operations as they are in land deployments such as long-range reconnaissance and close-quarter combat.

Organization
The force has its Headquarters (HQ) on the outskirts of Belize City where storage and maintenance facilities for its boats are also found. Coming under the HQ are the CSOG, the fleet command also known as First Fleet, and the service and support group, which includes the training company handling recruit training, stores, and equipment supplies, as well as the maintenance component of the BCG.

The First Fleet includes an HQ and is broken down into northern, central, and southern sectors, each comprising three 30-man platoons. These are made up of boat teams and boarding teams, with each sector providing them with a pool of two Justice 370s and four other craft for operations. One platoon is usually on operation, with another training and the third on leave.

Each sector is responsible for the operation of several forward operating bases: six being coastguard stations, while seven are joint facilities where the BCG works alongside the BDF (Belize Defence Force), the Belize Fisheries Department, customs officials, and NGOs. Directly under the First Fleet commandant is the Strike Team: an eight-man special operations unit specialising in maritime interdiction, counter-narcotics missions, and amphibious operations. Stood up in 2016, it is now slated for amalgamation into the CSOG to consolidate all BCG special operations assets within a single unit. A platoon-sized force, CSOG was formed in 2013 to respond to the degrading security situation in the north of the island of Ambergris Caye. “Different gangs would clash over
drugs washed ashore. People would be found in shallow graves. They would harass the locals with home invasions, steal their boats, and sell them in Mexico.

Personnel
As of November 2019, the Coast Guard service has a strength of 600 men and women, referred to as "guardsmen."

As the Coast Guard broadens its scope it is evident that there is a need to increase its strength. In November 2019 they graduated the largest class since existence. Eighty five recruits joined their ranks. This is a demonstration of government's commitment to the Belize Coast Guard. In addition to personnel administration, one hundred and six persons were promoted across the ranks. This is a steady progression and capacity building in the right direction.

Their international partners also play a crucial role in supporting the Belize Coast Guard. Their professional military education and training is a result of the international relationship that remains strong through 2020. The United States of America, Mexico, the United Kingdom, Canada and Taiwan, at the Multi National Security Conference in September 2019 have all committed to continue to support the Belize Coast Guard. In that regard, one hundred and six (or 20%) Coast Guard personnel has been overseas for training and exercises in 2019. The exposure gained and expertise developed over the past year is one of the main reason for their high level professionalism that the nation has come to respect. This international relationship saw the successful completion of the 4 year long commitment from the US Marine to support the development of the Coast Guard Marines. That program matured in September 2019, and they are now prepared to continue developing Coast Guard Marines.

Commandant of the Belize Coast Guard is Captain Elton Bennett.

Ranks

Commissioned Officers

Enlisted

Bases
Headquarters

The chief base of the Belize Coast Guard Service is located at mile 4 on the Western Highway. 

The new headquarters was built with the assistance from the US southern command. It was formerly located at Ladyville.

Calabash Caye

The Forward Operating Base at Calabash Caye was inaugurated on March 17, 2010. It was built at a cost of $3,000.000.00. . Boats are stationed at Caye Caulker and San Pedro under the operational control of Ladyville.

San Pedro
On Friday, November 29, 2013, the Belize Coast Guard (as part of their 8th anniversary celebrations) inaugurated its northern Forward Operating Base on Ambergris Caye and also held the graduation ceremony of its fourth intake.

Bacalar Chico
The Belize Coast Guard (BCG) officially opened its new patrol base on Friday, July 26. The new outlook post in the Bacalar Chico area, a mile and a half away from the Mexican border, will not only serve to patrol the northern coast of the island, but also deter any sort of criminal activities that threaten the safety and economic progress of Ambergris Caye

Hunting Caye
Hunting Caye is located at the southern apex of the Belize and northern Honduras/Guatemala maritime border and it provides that forward deployment from where they can project sea power in encountering transnational organized crime.

Equipment
In 2007, the Coast Guard Service had eight boats in commission. There are no aircraft; for air searches the Coast Guard Service relies on the Belize Defence Force.
The Belize Coast Guard Service received several fast boats from the United States Coast Guard in 2008. These boats have a maximum speed of 60 to 65 miles per hour (100 to 108 km/h).The Belize Coast Guard inaugurated a new facility on December 2, 2013.

Plans 

The Belize National Coast Guard, along with growing its strength in numbers, is also looking to expand its fleet of naval vessels.  Maritime law enforcement agency will procure a pair of patrol boats through a loan from the Central American Bank for Economic Integration.  The CABEI loan, as it is called, will allow the Ministry of National Security to upgrade a number of facilities and acquire other assets across all branches of law enforcement.  The Sea Axe Class vessels are considerably larger than the Boston Whalers currently in use by the coast guard and will allow for wider coverage of Belizean waters.  While Belize is in talks with Mexico to acquire both ships, no date has been set for their procurement.

Logistic vehicles

Weapons

Coast Guard Fleet

Notes

References

Coast guards
Sea rescue organizations
Emergency management in Belize
Organisations based in Belize
2005 establishments in Belize
Organizations established in 2005